Lunda, also known as Chilunda, is a Bantu language spoken in Zambia, Angola and, to a lesser extent, in the Democratic Republic of the Congo (DRC). Lunda and its dialects are spoken and understood by perhaps 4.6% of Zambians (1986 estimate), and the language is used mainly in the Northwestern province of Zambia. The majority of the Lunda can be found in DRC, especially Katanga Province, as well as in Angola. A small number of Lunda dialects are represented in Namibia.

Phonology

Vowels 

Vowel length is contrastive.

Consonants 

/w/ may also be heard as a bilabial glide [β̞].

References

External links
Lunda language stories, Lubuto Library Special Collections
OLAC resources in and about the Lunda language

Lunda languages
Languages of Angola
Languages of the Democratic Republic of the Congo
Languages of Zambia
Lunda people
Library of Congress Africa Collection related